Great Oaks may refer to:

 Great Oaks Institute of Technology and Career Development
 Great Oaks (Greenwood, Florida), a historical site in Greenwood, Florida
Great Oaks (Roswell, Georgia), historic house in Roswell Historic District
 Great Oaks Entertainment, a short-lived film production company